This is a list of the world's bus operating companies listed by country, with countries placed alphabetically by continent and country. Wherever possible, each country's bus operating companies are divided by the nature of their operations. Operations may be logically divided by defining attributes such as 

Ownership (private or public)
Primary function
Area served

This list includes companies operating now. It does not include bus manufacturers or repairers. It contains mostly public transit operators.

Africa

Egypt

Cairo Transportation Authority (CTA)
 Arab Union for Land Transport Company

South Africa
Golden Arrow Bus Services
Rea Vaya
PUTCO

Tunisia
 Société des Transports de Tunis (STT)

The Americas

Canada

National
 First Student Canada
 Greyhound Canada
 Pacific Western Transportation

Alberta
Calgary Transit
Edmonton Transit Service
Lethbridge Transit

British Columbia
BC Transit
Coast Mountain Bus Company
MTR Western
South Coast British Columbia Transportation Authority

Manitoba
Grey Goose Bus Lines
Jefferson Lines
Winnipeg Transit

Newfoundland and Labrador
DRL Group
Metrobus Transit

Nova Scotia
Metro Transit (Halifax)

New Brunswick
Codiac Transpo
Fredericton Transit
Maritime Bus
Miramichi Transit
Saint John Transit

Ontario
Refer to Bus companies in Ontario
Brampton Transit (Brampton, Ontario)
Burlington Transit
Coach Canada
Durham Region Transit
GO Transit (Greater Toronto Area)
Grand River Transit (Waterloo, Ontario), (Kitchener, Ontario), (Cambridge, Ontario)
Hamilton Street Railway (Hamilton, Ontario)
London Transit Commission (LTC)
Milton Transit
MiWay (Mississauga)
North Bay Transit 
Oakville Transit
OC Transpo (Ottawa)
Ontario Northland
Sault Transit Services (Sault Ste. Marie)
Thunder Bay Transit
TOK Coachlines
Toronto Transit Commission (TTC)
Viva (bus rapid transit) 
York Region Transit (North of Toronto) (YRT)
Züm (Part of Brampton Transit)

Quebec
 CIT du Sud-Ouest
 Groupe Galland
 Groupe La Québécoise
 Intercar
 Limocar
 Orléans Express
 Réseau de transport de la Capitale
 Réseau de transport de Longueuil
 Société de transport de Laval (STL)
 Société de transport de l'Outaouais
 Société de transport de Montréal (STM)

Saskatchewan
 Regina Transit
 Saskatchewan Transportation Company
 Saskatoon Transit

United States

Public municipal transit

 ABQ RIDE
 AC Transit
 Bangor Area Transit (Bangor, Maine)
 Big Blue Bus (Santa Monica, California)
 Bloomington Transit (Bloomington, Indiana)
 Broome County Transit (Binghamton, New York)
 Capital Area Transportation Authority (Lansing, Michigan)
 Capital District Transportation Authority (Albany, New York)
 Capital Metropolitan Transportation Authority (Capital MetroBus) (Austin, Texas)
 Central New York Regional Transportation Authority (Centro) (Syracuse, New York, Utica, New York)
 Central Ohio Transit Authority (Columbus, Ohio)
 Champaign-Urbana Mass Transit District
 Chapel Hill Transit
 Chicago Transit Authority
 Citizens Area Transit – Las Vegas, Nevada
 County Connection
 Detroit Department of Transportation
 Dragon Bus
 Fort Wayne Citilink
 Gary Public Transportation Corporation (GPTC) Gary, Indiana
GoDurham
GoRaleigh (Raleigh, North Carolina)
 Golden Gate Transit
 Greater Attleboro Taunton Regional Transit Authority (GATRA) (Bristol County, Massachusetts, Plymouth County, Massachusetts)
 Greater Lafayette Public Transportation Corporation
 Greater Peoria Mass Transit District
 Gwinnett County Transit (Gwinnett County, Georgia)
 Indianapolis Public Transportation Corporation
 King County Metro Transit
 Lehigh and Northampton Transportation Authority
 Los Angeles County Metropolitan Transportation Authority
 Maryland Transit Administration
 Massachusetts Bay Transportation Authority
 METRO (Portland, Maine)
 Metro Transit (Minneapolis-St. Paul)
 MetroBus
 Metropolitan Area Commuter System
 Metropolitan Atlanta Rapid Transit Authority (MARTA)
 Metropolitan Evansville Transit System
 Metropolitan Transit Authority of Harris County, Texas
 Miami-Dade Transit
 Mountain Metropolitan Transit (Colorado Springs)
 MTR Western
 Muncie Indiana Transit System
 Niagara Frontier Transportation Authority (Buffalo, New York)
 New Jersey Transit
 New York City Transit Authority/MTA Bus Company
 Pioneer Valley Transit Authority (Amherst, Northampton, and Springfield, Massachusetts)
 Port Authority of Allegheny County (Pittsburgh)
 Regional Transit Service (Rochester, New York)
 Rhode Island Public Transit Authority
 River Valley Transit (Williamsport, Pennsylvania)
 Rochester-Genesee Regional Transportation Authority
 Rogue Valley Transportation District (Medford, Oregon)
 St. Lawrence County Commuter
 SamTrans
 Muni
 Santa Clara Valley Transportation Authority
 The Shuttle (Oregon Department of Transportation)
 South Bend TRANSPO
 South Portland Bus Service (South Portland, Maine)
 Southeastern Pennsylvania Transportation Authority (SEPTA)
 Southwest Ohio Regional Transit Authority
 SMART (Greater Detroit, Michigan)
 TheBus (Honolulu) (O'ahu Transit Services, Inc.)
Ann Arbor Area Transportation Authority (TheRide)
 Tompkins Consolidated Area Transit (TCAT) (Ithaca, New York)
 Transit Authority of River City
 Tri-Delta Transit
 Triangle Transit Authority (Research Triangle region, North Carolina)
 Union City Transit
 Unitrans
 Utah Transit Authority (Salt Lake City, Utah)
 Vallejo Transit
 VIA Metropolitan Transit (San Antonio, Texas)
 WestCAT

Private long distance coaches and buses
 Badger Bus
 Barons Bus Lines
 Burlington Trailways
 Bustang
 Coach USA
 Express Arrow
 Greyhound Lines
 GOGO Charters
 Indian Trails
 Jefferson Lines
 Lamers Bus Lines
 Limoliner
 Megabus (subsidiary of Stagecoach Group)
 Orange Belt Stages
 Palmer Bus Service
 Panhandle Trails
 Peter Pan Arrow (subsidiary of Peter Pan Bus Lines in Washington D.C.)
 Peter Pan Bus Lines
 Stagecoach Group
 Amtrak Thruway (operated by private companies under contract)
 Trailways Transportation System (77 independent bus companies in the U.S. entered into a franchising agreement)
 Trans-Bridge Lines
 Washington Deluxe
 Vamoose Bus

School buses
 Atlantic Express (defunct, Chapter 11 bankruptcy)
 First Student
 Laidlaw (defunct, merged with First Student)
 Student Transportation of America

Asia

Afghanistan
Millie Bus

Azerbaijan
BakuBus LLC

Bangladesh
Bangladesh Road Transport Corporation (state-owned)

China

Beijing

Beijing Airport Buses

Hong Kong

Citybus
Kowloon Motor Bus
Long Win Bus
MTR Corporation (originally operated by Kowloon-Canton Railway Corporation, now transferred to MTR Corporation because of railway merger)
New Lantao Bus
New World First Bus
China Motor Bus (now defunct)

India
India has several bus operators. Some are privately run while others are run by state governments municipal bodies or private companies. State government buses ply not only in their states but also in neighbouring states. Municipal body buses ply in their own city as well as in neighbouring cities or towns. Here only list of government operated buses are there.

Andhra Pradesh
 
Andhra Pradesh State Road Transport Corporation (APSRTC)

Arunachal Pradesh
 
Arunachal Pradesh State Transport Services (APSTC)

Assam
 
Assam State Transport Corporation (ASTC)

Bihar
 
Bihar State Road Transport Corporation (BSRTC)

Chandigarh

Chandigarh Transport Undertaking (CTU)

Chhattisgarh
 
Chhattisgarh State Road Transport Corporation (CSRTC)

Delhi

Delhi Transport Corporation (DTC)
Delhi Integrated Multi-Modal Transit System (DIMTS Cluster Bus)

Gujarat

Ahmedabad Janmarg Limited (Operator of Ahmedabad Bus Rapid Transit System)
Ahmedabad Municipal Transport Service (AMTS)
Gujarat State Road Transport Corporation (GSRTC)
Surat City Bus

Goa

Kadamba Transport Corporation

Haryana

Haryana Roadways (HR)

Himachal Pradesh

Himachal Road Transport Corporation (HRTC)

Jammu & kashmir
 
Jammu and Kashmir State Road Transport Corporation (JKSRTC)

Karnataka

Karnataka State Road Transport Corporation (KSRTC)
Bangalore Metropolitan Transport Corporation (BMTC)
Kalyana Karnataka Road Transport Corporation (KKRTC)
North Western Karnataka Road Transport Corporation (NWKRTC)

Kerala

Kerala State Road Transport Corporation
Kerala Urban Road Transport Corporation

Ladakh
Jammu and Kashmir State Road Transport Corporation (JKSRTC)

Madhya Pradesh
 
Bhopal City Link Limited (MYLINKBUS) (also operator of Bhopal Bus Rapid Transit System)
Atal Indore City Transport Service Limited (AiCSTL) (also operator of Indore Bus Rapid Transit System)

Maharashtra

Maharashtra State Road Transport Corporation (MSRTC)
Brihanmumbai Electric Supply and Transport (BEST)
Mira-Bhayandar Municipal Transport (MBMT)
Kalyan-Dombivli Municipal Transport (KDT)
Nagpur Mahanagar Parivahan Limited (NMPL)
Navi Mumbai Municipal Transport (NMMT)
Pune Mahanagar Parivahan Mahamandal Limited (PMPML)
Thane Municipal Transport (TMT)

Orissa

Orissa State Road Transport Corporation (OSRTC)

Puducherry
 
Puducherry Road Transport Corporation (PRTC)

Punjab

Punjab Roadways (PR)
PEPSU Road Transport Corporation (PRTC)

Rajasthan

Rajasthan State Road Transport Corporation
Jaipur City Transport Services Limited (JCTSL)

Tamil Nadu

Metropolitan Transport Corporation (MTC)
State Express Transport Corporation (SETC)

Telangana

Telangana State Road Transport Corporation (TSRTC)

Tripura
 
Tripura Road Transport Corporation (TRTC)

Uttarakhand
 
Uttarakhand Transport Corporation (UTC)

Uttar Pradesh
 
Uttar Pradesh State Road Transport Corporation (UPSRTC)
Lucknow Mahanagar Parivahan Sewa (LMPS)
Lucknow Upnagariya Parivahan Sewa (LUPS)
Kanpur Lucknow Roadways Service (KLRS)
Noida Metro Rail Corporation (NMRCL)

West Bengal

North Bengal State Transport Corporation (NBSTC)
South Bengal State Transport Corporation (SBSTC)
West Bengal Transport Corporation (WBTC)

Indonesia

Iran
 Karaj City Buses
 Andisheh City Buses
 Malard City Buses
 Shahriar City Buses
 Tehran BRT
 Tabriz City Buses

Israel
Dan Bus Company 
Dan Beersheva
Dan BaDarom
Egged Bus Cooperative 
Egged Ta'avura
Kavim
Metronit
Metropoline
Nateev Express
Superbus
Veolia Transport (formerly Connex)
Afikim

Japan

Macau
Macau New Era Public Bus Co Ltd (ended operation, merged with T.C.M. on August 1, 2018)
Reolian Public Transport Co (bankrupt, replaced with Macau New Era Public Bus Co Ltd)
Transmac
Transportas Companhia de Macau (TCM)

Malaysia
Every state has its own bus operators in Malaysia.
Penang
RapidPenang
Kuala Lumpur
Causeway Link
Metrobus Nationwide (this operator only does commuting services in Kuala Lumpur, Petaling Jaya, and Klang Valley; they also operate express buses throughout the country, hence the name "Nationwide")
RapidKL

Mongolia
 
Tenuun-Ogoo.LLC

Myanmar
Yangon Region Transport Authority (YRTA)

Nepal
Sajha Yatayat

Pakistan
Bilal Travels
Daewoo Express
Lahore Transport Company
Punjab Mass Transit Authority
Faisal Movers
Sania Express
Skyways

Philippines

Ceres Liner
Ceres Transport
Ceres Tours
Philtranco
Victory Liner
GV Florida Transport

Saudi Arabia
Nasser Abduallah Abu Sarhad Company 
Saudi Public Transport Company (SAPTCO)
Hafil Transport Company

Singapore
SBS Transit
SMRT Corporation
Tower Transit Singapore
Go-Ahead Singapore

Sri Lanka
Sri Lanka Transport Board

United Arab Emirates

Dubai Emirate

Roads and Transport Authority (RTA)

Dubai Bus Transport Company

Australasia

Australia

Interstate
Australian Transit Group
BusBiz
Busways
Carbridge
Crisps Coaches
Dysons
Firefly Express
Greyhound Australia
Murrays
Premier Transport Group
Sunstate Coaches

Australian Capital Territory
ACTION

New South Wales

Sydney
Baxter's Bus Lines
Busabout
Forest Coach Lines
Hillsbus
Interline Bus Services
Keolis Downer Northern Beaches
Maianbar Bundeena Bus Service
Metro-link Bus Lines
North Sydney Bus Charters
Punchbowl Bus Company
Telfords Bus & Coach
Transdev John Holland
Transdev NSW
Transit Scenic Tours
Transit Systems NSW

Regional
Busabout Wagga Wagga
BusBiz
Buslines Group
CDC Broken Hill
CDC Canberra
Coastal Liner
Crowthers
Dion's Bus Service
Fantastic Aussie Tours
Forest Coach Lines
Hopkinsons
Hunter Valley Buses
New England Coaches
Newcastle Transport
Picton Buslines
Port Stephens Coaches
Prior's Bus Service
Red Bus Services
Rover Coaches
Sid Fogg's
Snowliner Coaches
Symes Coaches
Western Road Liners

Long distance
Australia Wide Coaches

Northern Territory
CDC Northern Territory
Darwinbus

Queensland

Brisbane
Bribie Island Coaches
Brisbane Bus Lines 
Caboolture Bus Lines
Cavanagh Bus Group
Clarks Logan City Bus Service
Hornibrook Bus Lines
Kangaroo Bus Lines 
Logan City Bus Service
Mt Gravatt Bus Service
Park Ridge Transit
Southern Cross Transit
Thompsons Bus Service
Transdev Queensland
Transport for Brisbane
Westside Bus Company

Gold Coast
Surfside Buslines

Sunshine Coast
CDC Sunshine Coast
Sunbus Sunshine Coast

Regional
Bus Queensland
CDC Gladstone
Mackay Transit Coaches
Stewart & Sons
Stonestreets Coaches
Sunbus Cairns
Sunbus Rockhampton
Sunbus Townsville
Trans North Bus & Coach
Young's Bus Service

South Australia

Adelaide
SouthLink
Torrens Connect
Torrens Transit

Regional
LinkSA

Long distance
Stateliner

Tasmania
Metro Tasmania
Redline Coaches
Tassielink Transit

Victoria

Melbourne
Broadmeadows Bus Service
CDC Melbourne
Cranbourne Transit
Kastoria Bus Lines
Kinetic Melbourne
Martyrs Bus Service
McKenzie's Tourist Services
Moonee Valley Coaches
Moreland Buslines
Panorama Coaches
Ryan Brothers Bus Service
Quince's Scenicruisers
SkyBus
Sunbury Bus Service
Transit Systems Victoria
Ventura Bus Lines
Victorian Touring Coaches

Regional
CDC Ballarat
CDC Geelong
McHarry's Buslines

Western Australia

Perth
Path Transit
Swan Transit
Transdev WA

Regional
Love's Bus Service

Long distance
South West Coach Lines
TransWA

New Zealand
Birkenhead Transport
Go Bus
Go Wellington
Intercity
Nakedbus.com
NZ Bus
Red Bus
Ritchies Transport
Skip Bus (part of the Intercity group)
SkyBus
Tranzit Group

Europe

Belgium
MIVB/STIB (Brussels)
De Lijn (Flemish Region)
TEC (Wallonia)

Croatia
ZET

Denmark
Arriva
Movia
Nordjyllands Trafikselskab (NT)
Busselskabet Aarhus Sporveje

Switzerland
Verkehrsbetriebe Zürich
Zürcher Verkehrsverbund
Postauto
EUROBUS

France
BlaBlaBus
FlixBus
Keolis
RATP
Transdev

Germany
Berliner Verkehrsbetriebe (BVG)
Hamburger Hochbahn (HHA)
Deinbus
FlixBus
Postbus (formerly ADAC Postbus)

Hungary

National 
 Volánbusz

Budapest 
BKK (shortened for Budapesti Közlekedési Központ, serving Budapest bus transport, planning schedules)
BKV Zrt. (shortened for Budapesti Közlekedési Vállalat, operator of Budapest bus transport)

Debrecen 
 DKV Zrt.

Szeged 
 SZKT Zrt.

Iceland
Strætó bs

Ireland
Bus Éireann
Dublin Bus
Go-Ahead Ireland
JJ Kavanagh and Sons
Aircoach

Isle of Man
Bus Vannin

Italy
 AMT Genova
 AMTAB
 ANM (Naples)
 ARST
 ASF Autolinee
 ATAC SpA
 Autolinee Toscane
 Azienda Trasporti Milanesi
 Consorzio Trasporti Pubblici Insubria
 Cotral
 Gruppo Torinese Trasporti
 Terravision Italia
 TPER

Liechtenstein
Liechtenstein Bus

Malta
Malta Public Transport Services Limited

Montenegro
4 Decembar Nikšić
Glušica Nikšić

the Netherlands
Arriva Personenvervoer Nederland
Connexxion
Eurolines
GVB
HTM
Keolis Nederland
Qbuzz
RET

Norway

Romania
RATB (Bucharest)
CTP (Cluj-Napoca)
RATP (Iași)
OTL (Oradea)
RATT (Timișoara)

Russia
There are no nationwide bus operators in Russia, as passenger operations have been traditionally conducted by the Russian Railways. Despite that, there are local bus operators (privately or state-owned) usually called PATP or ATP (literally passenger auto-transportation enterprise or auto-transportation enterprise) which send their buses to Moscow, St. Petersburg, or neighboring cities. There is no unified database of schedules of such routes, and tickets can be purchased on site only.

Serbia
Lasta Beograd
GSP Beograd
JGSP Novi Sad
FENIKS GiZ Novi Sad

Spain
 ALSA
 TITSA (Tenerife)
TMB (Barcelona)

United Kingdom

 Arriva
 FirstGroup
 Go-Ahead Group
 Lothian Buses
 National Express
 RATP Group
 Rotala
 Stagecoach Group
 Transdev
 Ulsterbus
 Wellglade Group

References

Lists of transport companies
 
Lists of bus operating companies